Operation Concrete (1955) is a documentary made by French filmmaker Jean-Luc Godard, preceding his work in narrative, fiction film. The film shows the construction of the massive concrete Grande Dixence Dam in Valais, Switzerland.

External links

1955 films
1950s French-language films
Films directed by Jean-Luc Godard
1950s short documentary films
French black-and-white films
French short documentary films
1955 documentary films
1955 directorial debut films
1950s French films